Senegalia montis-salinarum, is a species of thorn tree that is native to two separate localities in the Soutpansberg range in Limpopo, South Africa. The total population is estimated at no more than 250 adult trees. Based on its morphology, it is assigned to the S. burkei species complex.

Habitat
It grows on rocky scree slopes in the hot rain shadow of the Soutpansberg range.

Description
It is a multi-stemmed tree. It has smaller flowers than A. burkei and produces more seeds. The wood is soft and semi-succulent, and dead wood decays quickly.

Status
It may qualify as endangered due to the small population size and the proximity of the type locality to Coal of Africa's Makhado Colliery project.

References

polyacantha
Trees of South Africa
Endemic flora of South Africa